The Vienna Art Orchestra was a European jazz group based in Vienna, Austria. Organized at different times as either a big band or as a smaller combo, it was regarded as one of the leading European jazz ensembles and was an official cultural ambassador of the Republic of Austria.

History
Founded in 1977 by director and composer Mathias Rüegg, the band started out by performing Rüegg's postmodern compositions on stages throughout Europe. Among the founding musicians were singer Lauren Newton, saxophonists Wolfgang Puschnig and Harry Sokal, trombone player Christian Radovan, tuba player Jon Sass, and mallet percussionist Woody Schabata. In 1980, the ensemble signed a recording contract with the Swiss hatART label, and in 1984 they toured the United States for the first time.

The group essentially disbanded for a brief period at the end of the 1980s. In 1992, the VAO opened a new phase with a smaller complement of musicians. The band played fewer of Rüegg's compositions and concentrated on arrangements of works by Duke Ellington, Charles Mingus, and other noted American jazz composers, as well as music inspired by the classical music of Verdi, Wagner, Schubert, and Erik Satie.

In 1997, the ensemble's personnel changed once again, increasing in size and adding younger musicians. New compositions by Rüegg became a regular feature of VAO concerts, which often included visual and dramatic elements.

The Vienna Art Orchestra has performed more than 800 concerts and released more than 35 recordings. The film An Echo from Europe: Vienna Art Orchestra on Tour by Othmar Schmiderer was released in 1998.

The ensemble was nominated for an Amadeus Austrian Music Award in 2001 for the album All That Strauss, and again in 2003 for Art and Fun.

On July 10, 2010, Mathias Rüegg announced that the Vienna Art Orchestra had been disbanded for financial reasons.

Discography

Vienna Art Orchestra

Vienna Art Special

Vienna Art Choir

Vienna Art Orchestra with Ernst Jandl

See also

List of experimental big bands

References

External links
 Vienna Art Orchestra official website
  Mathias Rüegg official website
Vienna Art Orchestra unofficial discography (with details taken from actual LPs/CDs) - https://vao.neocities.org/

Austrian jazz ensembles
Big bands
Experimental big bands
Musical groups established in 1977
Musical groups from Vienna
1977 establishments in Austria
Musical groups disestablished in 2010
2010 disestablishments in Austria
Organisations based in Vienna